Macaduma tortricella is a moth of the subfamily Arctiinae. It was described by Francis Walker in 1866. It is found on Java and in Assam, India and New Guinea.

References

Macaduma
Moths described in 1866